The mixed double sculls competition at the 2012 Summer Paralympics in London took place at Dorney Lake which, for the purposes of the Games venue, is officially termed Eton Dorney.

Results

Heats
The winner of each heat qualified to the finals, remainder to the repechage.

Heat 1

Heat 2

Repechages
First two of each repechage qualified to the medal final, remainder to Final B.

Repechage 1

Repechage 2

Finals

Final A

Final B

External links
Official Site of the 2012 Summer Paralympics - Rowing

Mixed double sculls